Maximilian Götz (born 4 February 1986) is a German racing driver. He has competed in such series as International Formula Master and the Formula 3 Euro Series. He won the 2003 Formula BMW ADAC season, taking six victories. He also won the 2021 Deutsche Tourenwagen Masters by finishing three points ahead of Liam Lawson in the drivers' championship.

Career

IMSA SportsCar Championship
On January 5, 2022, Alegra Motorsports announced that Götz would compete alongside Linus Lundqvist, Daniel Morad and Michael de Quesada in the #28 Mercedes for the 2022 24 Hours of Daytona.

FIA World Endurance Championship
In 2023, Goetz began a partnership with Scuderia Cameron Glickenhaus, appearing as a guest of the team at the pre-season WEC Prologue.

Racing record

Career summary

† Guest driver ineligible to score points

Complete Formula 3 Euro Series record
(key)

† Driver did not finish the race, but was classified as he completed over 90% of the race distance.
‡ As Götz was a guest driver, he was ineligible for championship points.

Complete GT World Challenge Sprint Cup results

Complete Deutsche Tourenwagen Masters results
(key) (Races in bold indicate pole position) (Races in italics indicate fastest lap)

Complete IMSA SportsCar Championship results
(key) (Races in bold indicate pole position; results in italics indicate fastest lap)

References

External links
 
 
 Stats results on Racing Years

1986 births
Living people
People from Ochsenfurt
Sportspeople from Lower Franconia
German racing drivers
Formula BMW ADAC drivers
Formula 3 Euro Series drivers
International Formula Master drivers
Racing drivers from Bavaria
Blancpain Endurance Series drivers
ADAC GT Masters drivers
24 Hours of Spa drivers
Deutsche Tourenwagen Masters drivers
24H Series drivers
Deutsche Tourenwagen Masters champions
Nürburgring 24 Hours drivers
WeatherTech SportsCar Championship drivers
Mercedes-AMG Motorsport drivers
Mücke Motorsport drivers
Kolles Racing drivers
RC Motorsport drivers
HWA Team drivers
Strakka Racing drivers
ISR Racing drivers
Craft-Bamboo Racing drivers